Aeridostachya feddeana is a species of plant within the orchid family. It is native to New Guinea.

References

Flora of New Guinea
feddeana